was a railway station on the Tadami Line in Uonuma, Niigata Prefecture, Japan, operated by East Japan Railway Company (JR East). It opened in 1951 as a temporary station, became a permanent station in 1987, and closed in March 2015.

History
With the privatization of JNR on 1 April 1987, it became a permanent station under the control of JR East. The station was closed from the start of the timetable revision introduced on 14 March 2015.

See also
 List of railway stations in Japan

References

External links

 

Railway stations in Niigata Prefecture
Stations of East Japan Railway Company
Railway stations in Japan opened in 1951
Railway stations closed in 2015
2015 disestablishments in Japan